The Library Hall of Fame was a list created in 1951 that recognized leaders of the late 19th- and early 20th-century library movement, on the occasion of the 75th anniversary of the American Library Association.

A similar list was published in 1999, honoring "100 of the most important people in 20th-century librarianship," limited to "only people who lived and died in [the 20th century]."

Members

External links
 100 of the Most Important Leaders We Had in the 20th Century: A guide to archival holdings

References

Halls of fame in Illinois
American Library Association awards